Girl of the Golden West (Italian: Una signora dell'ovest) is a 1942 Italian western film directed by Carl Koch and starring Michel Simon, Isa Pola and Rossano Brazzi. It is based on the 1936 novel, La Dame de l'Ouest,  by Pierre Benoit. It was made at the Scalera Studios in Rome, and on location in Lazio countryside. The film's title alludes to the opera The Girl of the Golden West by Giacomo Puccini, but is not an adaptation of it. It was one of only a handful of Westerns to be made during the silent and Fascist eras, in a genre in which Italy later became famous.

Synopsis
Arianna, an Italian actress, joins a caravan heading into the American West with her companion Diego. Diego is eventually killed by a local villain. Arianna falls in love with the villain without realising that he is the murderer.

Cast
 Michel Simon as Butler
 Isa Pola as Arianna
 Rossano Brazzi as William
 Valentina Cortese as Madge
  as Diego
 Carlo Duse as un dipendente di Butler
 Vittorio Duse
 Cesare Fantoni
 Oreste Fares
 Nicola Maldacea
 Augusto Marcacci
 Amina Pirani Maggi
 Corrado Racca

References

Bibliography

External links 
 
 

1942 Western (genre) films
1942 films
Films about actors
Films based on French novels
Films based on works by Pierre Benoit
Films directed by Carl Koch
Films scored by Mario Nascimbene
Films set in the United States
Films shot at Scalera Studios
Films shot in Italy
Italian Western (genre) films
Italian black-and-white films
1940s Italian-language films
1940s Italian films